Ernst Wiesner, also known as Arnošt Wiesner (21 January 1890, in Malacky, Kingdom of Hungary, Austro-Hungarian Empire – 15 July 1971, in Liverpool) was a modernist architect, one of the foremost interwar period architects of Brno. His ancestors with German surnames Wiesner came from the area of modern Austria.

From 1908 to 1913 Wiesner studied at the Technical College and the Academy of Arts (taught by B. Ohmann) in Vienna. After World War I he worked as an independent architect in the city of Brno, until 1939. Wiesner was a very active architect in the city between the World Wars. His work was greatly influenced by Adolf Loos and his pure constructions with their classicized balance and monumentality are amongst the best works to be constructed in Brno at that time.

Afterwards Wiesner emigrated to Great Britain where he joins the foreign anti-fascist resistance. After World War II he stayed in Britain. During 1948-1950 he acted as a lecturer in the School of Architecture at the University of Oxford and during 1950–1960 at the University of Liverpool. In 1969 he was nominated to the rank of honorary doctor by the University of Jan Evangelista Purkyně (now Masaryk University) in Brno. When he died in 1971 he was buried in Liverpool's Allerton Cemetery.

Architectural works in Brno 
 Gutmannův dům (Gutmann's house) 1919–22
 Moravská zemská životní pojišťovna (Moravian Provincial Life Insurance Company) 1920–1923
 Česká banka Union (Czech Union Bank; later seat of local branch of the Czechoslovak Broadcast) 1923–26
 Krematorium (Crematorium) 1926–29
 Vila Stiassni 1927 - 1929
 Palác Morava (Palace Moravia) 1927–29. Completely finished in 1936
 Rodinný dvojdům (Double-family house) 1928
 Moravská banka (Moravian Bank) 1929–30, co-author Bohuslav Fuchs
 Činžovní dům Freundschaft (The Freundschaft ["Friendship"] tenement house) 1930–31
 Various family houses, industrial and manufacturing buildings around the City of Brno

References

Sources 

Ernst Wiesner 1890 - 1971, Obecní dům Brno 2005, 
http://www.bam.brno.cz/en/architect/32-ernst-wiesner?filter=code

1890 births
1971 deaths
People from Malacky
Czechoslovak emigrants to England
British people of Slovak-Jewish descent
Modernist architects
Czechoslovak architects
Masaryk University alumni